Pohar  — village (selo) in Stryi Raion, Lviv Oblast, of Western Ukraine. 
Local government — Oriavska village council. It belongs to Kozova rural hromada, one of the hromadas of Ukraine. 

The first record of the village dates back to 1578.

Until 18 July 2020, Pohar belonged to Skole Raion. The raion was abolished in July 2020 as part of the administrative reform of Ukraine, which reduced the number of raions of Lviv Oblast to seven. The area of Skole Raion was merged into Stryi Raion.

References

External links 
 village Pohar
 weather.in.ua
  Населенні пункти Сколівського району  -  Орява, Погар

Literature 
 

Villages in Stryi Raion